Institute of Public Administration may refer to:

HCM Rajasthan State Institute of Public Administration
Indian Institute of Public Administration
Institute of Public Administration Australia
Institute of Public Administration (Ireland)
 Institute of Public Administration, Campus The Hague, University of Leiden, Netherlands
Institute of Public Administration New Zealand
Korea Institute of Public Administration (South Korea)
National Institute of Public Administration (Pakistan)
Royal Institute of Public Administration, UK

See also
 Academy of Public Administration (disambiguation)